('Awake, calls the voice to us'), 140, also known as Sleepers Wake, is a church cantata by Johann Sebastian Bach, regarded as one of his most mature and popular sacred cantatas. He composed the chorale cantata in Leipzig for the 27th Sunday after Trinity and first performed it on 25 November 1731.

Bach composed this cantata to complete his second annual cycle of chorale cantatas, begun in 1724. The cantata is based on the hymn in three stanzas "" (1599) by Philipp Nicolai, which covers the prescribed reading for the Sunday, the parable of the Ten Virgins. The text and tune of the three stanzas of the hymn appears unchanged in three of seven movements (1, 4 and 7). An unknown author supplied additional poetry for the inner movements as sequences of recitative and duet, based on the love poetry of the Song of Songs. Bach structured the cantata in seven movements, setting the first stanza as a chorale fantasia, the second stanza in the central movement in the style of a chorale prelude, and the third stanza as a four-part chorale. He set the new texts as dramatic recitatives and love-duets, similar to contemporary opera. Bach scored the work for three vocal soloists (soprano, tenor and bass), a four-part choir and a Baroque instrumental ensemble consisting of a horn (to reinforce the soprano), two oboes, taille, violino piccolo, strings and basso continuo including bassoon.

Bach used the central movement of the cantata as the basis for the first of his Schübler Chorales, BWV 645. Bach scholar Alfred Dürr notes that the cantata is an expression of Christian mysticism in art, while William G. Whittaker calls it "a cantata without weaknesses, without a dull bar, technically, emotionally and spiritually of the highest order, its sheer perfection and its boundless imagination rouse one's wonder time and time again".

History, hymn and text 
Bach composed the cantata in Leipzig for the 27th Sunday after Trinity. This Sunday occurs only when Easter is early. The prescribed readings for the Sunday were from the First Epistle to the Thessalonians, be prepared for the day of the Lord, and from the Gospel of Matthew, the parable of the Ten Virgins.

Bach composed this cantata to complete his second annual cycle of cantatas of 1724/25, a cycle planned to be of chorale cantatas. It is based on Philipp Nicolai's Lutheran hymn in three stanzas, "", which is based on the Gospel. Published in Nicolai's   (Mirror of Joy of the Life Everlasting) in 1599, its text was introduced: "" (Another [call] of the voice at midnight and of the wise maidens who meet their celestial Bridegroom / Matthew 25 / D. Philippus Nicolai).

The text of the three stanzas appears unchanged and with the melody in the outer movements and the central movements (1, 4 and 7), while an unknown author supplied poetry for the other movements, twice a sequence of recitative and duet. He refers to the love poetry of the Song of Songs, showing Jesus as the bridegroom of the Soul. According to the Bach scholar Christoph Wolff, the text was already available when Bach composed his cycle of chorale cantatas.

Bach performed the cantata only once, in Leipzig's main church Nikolaikirche on 25 November 1731. According to Wolff, Bach performed it only this one time, although the 27th Sunday after Trinity occurred one more time during his tenure in Leipzig, in 1742. Bach used the central movement as the basis for the first of his Schübler Chorales, BWV 645.

As the text and its eschatological themes are also associated with Advent, the cantata is commonly performed during that season.

Music

Structure and scoring 

Bach structured the cantata in seven movements. The text and tune of the hymn are kept in the outer choral movements and the central movement, set as two chorale fantasias and a four-part closing chorale, which frame two sequences of recitative and aria. Bach scored the work for three vocal soloists (soprano (S), tenor (T), bass (B)), a four-part choir, (SATB) and a Baroque instrumental ensemble of horn (Co), two oboes (Ob), taille (Ot), violino piccolo (Vp), two violins (Vl), viola (Va), and basso continuo including bassoon. The heading of the original parts reads: "Dominica 27. post Trinit. / Wachet auf, rufft uns die Stime / â / 4. Voc. / 1. Violino picolo. / 2. Hautbois. / Taille. / Basson. / 2 Violini. / Viola. / e / Continuo. / di Signore / J.S.Bach." The duration is given as 31 minutes.

In the following table of the movements, the scoring follows the Neue Bach-Ausgabe. The keys and time signatures are taken from the book on all cantatas by the Bach scholar Alfred Dürr, using the symbol for common time (4/4). The continuo, playing throughout, is not shown.

Movements

1 

The first movement, "" ("Awake", we are called by the voice [of the watchmen]), is a chorale fantasia based on the first verse of the chorale, a common feature of Bach's earlier chorale cantatas. The cantus firmus is sung by the soprano. The orchestra plays independent material mainly based on two motifs: a dotted rhythm and an ascending scale "with syncopated accent shifts". The lower voices add in unusually free polyphonic music images such as the frequent calls "wach auf!" (wake up!) and "wo, wo?" (where, where?), and long melismas in a fugato on "Halleluja".

John Eliot Gardiner, who conducted the Bach Cantata Pilgrimage in 2000, notes two instrumental choirs, the strings and the double-reeds (two oboes, taille and bassoon), playing in the style of a French overture double-dotted motifs in triple rhythm. He writes:

2 
"" (He comes), is a recitative for tenor as a narrator who calls the "Töchter Zions" (daughters of Zion).

3 

In the following duet, "" (When are You coming, my Salvation?), with obbligato violino piccolo, the soprano represents the Soul and the bass is the vox Christi (voice of Jesus). In a slow siciliano, the violino piccolo illustrates "the flickering of lamps 'lit with burning oil in arabesques. Gardiner comments: "A rich tradition of similarly sensual musical allegories, including fine examples by Bach's own cousin, Johann Christoph, stands behind this ravishing number."

4 
The fourth movement, "" (Zion hears the watchmen singing), is based on the second verse of the chorale. It is written in the style of a chorale prelude, with the phrases of the chorale, sung as a cantus firmus by the tenors (or by the tenor soloist), entering intermittently against a famously lyrical melody played in unison by the violins (without the violino piccolo) and the viola, accompanied by the basso continuo.

Bach later transcribed this movement for organ (BWV 645), and it was subsequently published along with five other transcriptions Bach made of his cantata movements as the Schübler Chorales.

5 
The fifth movement, "" (Then come in to me), is a recitative for bass, accompanied by the strings. It pictures the unity of the bridegroom and the "chosen bride".

6 

The sixth movement, "" (My Friend is mine!), is another duet for soprano and bass with obbligato oboe. This duet, like the third movement, is a love duet between the soprano Soul and the bass Jesus. Gardiner notes that Bach uses the means of "contemporary operatic love-duets in his use of chains of suspensions and parallel thirds and sixths". Dürr describes it as giving "expression to the joy of the united pair", showing a "relaxed mood" in "artistic intensity".

7 
The closing chorale, "" (Let Gloria be sung to You), is a four-part setting of the third verse of the hymn. The high pitch of the melody is doubled by a violino piccolo an octave higher, representing the bliss of the "heavenly Jerusalem".

Evaluation 
The Bach scholar Klaus Hofmann sees the cantata as one of the composer's "most beautiful, most mature and, at the same time, most popular sacred cantatas". Dürr notes that the cantata, especially the duets in a unity of "earthly happiness in love and heavenly bliss", are an expression of Christian mysticism in art. William G. Whittaker wrote: "It is a cantata without weaknesses, without a dull bar, technically, emotionally and spiritually of the highest order, its sheer perfection and its boundless imagination rouse one's wonder time and time again."

Recordings 
The listing is taken from the selection on the Bach Cantatas Website. Choirs singing OVPP (one voice per part) and instrumental groups playing period instruments in historically informed performances are marked by green background.

Media 
The following recording of the cantata was performed by the MIT Chamber Chorus.

References

Cited sources 
Bach Digital
 

Book

Further reading

External links 
 Wachet auf, ruft uns die Stimme, BWV 140: performance by the Netherlands Bach Society (video and background information)
 
 Cantata BWV 140 – Wachet auf, ruft uns die Stimme (Johann Sebastian Bach) ChoralWiki
 BWV 140 Wachet auf, ruft uns die Stimme: English translation, University of Vermont
 Luke Dahn: Cantata BWV 140, Wachet auf The Bach Choir of Bethlehem

Church cantatas by Johann Sebastian Bach
1731 compositions
Advent music
Chorale cantatas